This is a list of foreign players in the Slovak First League, which commenced play in 1992. The following players must meet both of the following two criteria:
Have played at least one Slovak First League game. Players who were signed by Slovak First League clubs, but only played in lower league, cup and/or European games, or did not play in any competitive games at all, are not included.

In bold: players who have played at least one Slovak First League game in the current season (2011–12), and are still at the clubs for which they've played. This does not include current players of a Slovak First League club who have not played a Slovak First League game in the current season.

Details correct as of end of 2011–12 season. Next update will remove all players at relegated teams and that have left their clubs from Bold status, and add newly promoted teams' players. This will be undertaken on the first day of the 2012–13 season in July 2012.



Algeria
Samy Derras – FC Spartak Trnava – 2012
Youssef Haraoui – ŠK Slovan Bratislava – 1993

Argentina
Aldo Baéz – FK AS Trenčín – 2008–2014
Iván Díaz – FK AS Trenčín – 2012
Fabio Nigro – FK Mesto Prievidza, ŠK Slovan Bratislava – 1992–93, 1994–96
Nicolas Gorosito – FK Senica, ŠK Slovan Bratislava – 2011–12, 2012–present
Julio Serrano – ŠK Slovan Bratislava – 2008–10
Sebastián López – Artmedia Petržalka – 2002–03
Mauricio Rato – Artmedia Petržalka – 2002–03
Leonardo Ricatti – ŠK Slovan Bratislava, FK Dukla Banská Bystrica – 1993, 1994
Sergio Vittor – MŠK Žilina – 2010
Aldo Mores – FC ViOn Zlaté Moravce – 2008–09
Leandro Ledesma – ŠK Slovan Bratislava – 2012
Facundo Serra – ŠK Slovan Bratislava – 2013

Armenia
Narek Beglaryan – 1. FC Tatran Prešov – 2012

Austria
Rolf Landerl – FK Inter Bratislava, FK DAC 1904 Dunajská Streda – 1994–97, 2008
Yüksel Sariyar – FK DAC 1904 Dunajská Streda – 2010
Markus Seelaus – FK DAC 1904 Dunajská Streda – 2009–10
Cemil Tosun – FK DAC 1904 Dunajská Streda – 2009
Sladjan Pajić – FK DAC 1904 Dunajská Streda – 2010–11
Mato Šimunović – FC Nitra – 2009
Bartoloměj Kuru – FK DAC 1904 Dunajská Streda – 2009–10
Taner Ari – FK DAC 1904 Dunajská Streda – 2014

Azerbaijan
Ali Ghorbani – FC Spartak Trnava – 2018–present

Benin
Bello Babatounde – MŠK Žilina – 2006–2014
Stanislas Toclomiti – MŠK Žilina – 2006
Salomon Wisdom – MŠK Žilina, FC ViOn Zlaté Moravce – 2006–09, 2008–09

Bosnia and Herzegovina
Josip Kvesić – MŠK Žilina – 2008–09
Semir Kerla – MŠK Žilina – 2011–12
Admir Vladavić – MŠK Žilina – 2007–09, 2010–11
Josip Čorić – FC Spartak Trnava, FK DAC 1904 Dunajská Streda – 2010, 2011
Krešimir Kordić – ŠK Slovan Bratislava, FK DAC 1904 Dunajská Streda – 2010–2011, 2012
Nikola Mikelini – FK DAC 1904 Dunajská Streda – 2010
Staniša Nikolić – FK DAC 1904 Dunajská Streda – 2009–10, 2012
Ilija Prodanović – FK DAC 1904 Dunajská Streda – 2012
Mirko Radovanović – FK AS Trenčín – 2012
Avdija Vršajević – 1. FC Tatran Prešov – 2008–11
Dejan Drakul – 1. FC Tatran Prešov – 2009–2010
Mario Božić – ŠK Slovan Bratislava – 2009–2011
Samir Merzić – FK Senica – 2010–2011
Eldar Hasanović – MŠK Žilina – 2008–09
Almir Gegić – 1. FC Košice, Matador Púchov – 2001–02, 2002–04
Sergej Jakirović – FC Spartak Trnava – 1995–97
Velimir Vidić – MŠK Žilina – 2008
Vladimir Sladojević – MFK Ružomberok – 2004
Sedat Şahin – FK Dukla Banská Bystrica – 2006–07
Haris Hajradinović – FK AS Trenčín – 2013–present
Nikola Stijaković – MFK Košice – 2014–present
Nermin Haskić – MFK Košice – 2013–present
Adi Mehremić – MFK Ružomberok – 2013
Muris Mešanović – FK DAC 1904 Dunajská Streda – 2013
Irfan Hadžić – FC ViOn Zlaté Moravce – 2014

Brazil
Aderaldo – MŠK Žilina – 2004
Mariano Bernardo – 1. FC Tatran Prešov – 2009–2013
Ramón – FK AS Trenčín – 2012–present
Rafael – 1. FC Tatran Prešov – 2011–2012
Cléber – 1. FC Tatran Prešov – 2008
Higor – MFK Ružomberok, FC Spartak Trnava, 1. FC Tatran Prešov – 2010, 2010–11, 2011
Bolinha  – FK Senica,  FC ViOn Zlaté Moravce  – 2011, 2012–2014
Cleber – Artmedia Petržalka, FC Nitra, FC Spartak Trnava – 2008–09, 2012–2014, 2014–present
Zé Vitor – ŠK Slovan Bratislava – 2011
Adauto – MŠK Žilina – 2008–10
Kaká – FK Senica – 2011
Wellington – FC Spartak Trnava – 2010–11
Tiago Bernardini – FC Spartak Trnava – 2009–10
Gaúcho – FC Senec, ŠK Slovan Bratislava – 2008, 2008–10
Jymmy França – FC Spartak Trnava – 2009
Neto – FC Spartak Trnava – 2009–10
Danilo de Oliveira – FC Spartak Trnava – 2009–10
Caihame – MFK Petržalka – 2009
Pedro – MFK Petržalka – 2008–09
Diogo Pires – ŠK Slovan Bratislava, MFK Petržalka – 2008–10, 2010
Fabio Gomes – ŠK Slovan Bratislava, FC Spartak Trnava, MFK Ružomberok, MFK Petržalka– 1996–97, 1997–00, 2000–01, 2005–06
Luis Amaro – MŠK Rimavská Sobota – 2004–05
Guilherme Barbosa – MŠK Rimavská Sobota – 2005
Welker – FC Senec – 2006
Melinho – FK DAC 1904 Dunajská Streda – 2010–12
Roberto Pítio – FC Spartak Trnava – 2010
Felipe Azevedo – MFK Petržalka – 2009–10
Cafu – MFK Petržalka – 2010
Pio – MFK Ružomberok – 2010
Raphael Fernandes – MFK Ružomberok – 2005
Ismael – MFK Ružomberok – 2005
William –  FK AS Trenčín, MŠK Žilina – 2013, 2014–present
Dionatan Teixeira – MFK Košice, FK Dukla Banská Bystrica – 2009, 2013–2014
Hiago – FK Senica – 2013–2014
Cristovam – FK Senica – 2013–2014
Gabriel – FK DAC 1904 Dunajská Streda – 2013
Vitor Gava –  FK Senica – 2014
Jairo –  FK AS Trenčín – 2014–2015

Bulgaria
Branimir Kostadinov – 1. FC Tatran Prešov – 2012

Cameroon
Ernest Mabouka – MŠK Žilina – 2010–present
Léonard Kweuke – FK DAC 1904 Dunajská Streda – 2008–10
Bondoa Adiaba – FK DAC 1904 Dunajská Streda – 2008–2012
Ayuk Taku – FK DAC 1904 Dunajská Streda – 2012–2013
Jean Boya – FK DAC 1904 Dunajská Streda – 2008–2014
Joël Tchami – FK DAC 1904 Dunajská Streda – 2012
Martin Abena – FK DAC 1904 Dunajská Streda – 2008–2011
Jean Michel N'Lend – FK DAC 1904 Dunajská Streda – 2008–2009
Léandre Tawamba – FC Nitra, MFK Ružomberok – 2013, 2013–2014
Noé Kwin – FC DAC 1904 Dunajská Streda – 2013–present
Francky N'Guekam – FC DAC 1904 Dunajská Streda – 2014–present

Canada
Kevin Harmse – FC Nitra – 2006–07

Central African Republic
Alias Lembakoali – Matador Púchov, FK Inter Bratislava – 1997-01, 2001–05
Luciano Ray Djim – FC Senec – 2006–07

Congo
John Delarge – FK DAC 1904 Dunajská Streda – 2011–12
Elvis Mashike Sukisa – FC ViOn Zlaté Moravce – 2014–present

Congo DR
Daniel Bakongolia – FC ViOn Zlaté Moravce – 2008–10
Mulumba Mukendi – MFK Ružomberok – 2012–2013

Costa Rica
Pedro Leal – FK Senica – 2011–12

Croatia
Darko Matić – FC Senec – 2005–06
Nikola Melnjak – FC Spartak Trnava – 2010
Mislav Karoglan – MŠK Žilina – 2008–09
Nikola Schreng – MFK Košice – 2009–10
Mirko Plantić – FK DAC 1904 Dunajská Streda – 2008–09
Mate Dragičević – FK DAC 1904 Dunajská Streda – 2008
Kristijan Polovanec – MŠK Žilina – 2006
Danijel Kovačević – MŠK Žilina – 2005–06
Matej Jelić – MŠK Žilina – 2013–present
Darijo Krišto – FC DAC 1904 Dunajská Streda – 2014–present
Andrej Čaušić – FC DAC 1904 Dunajská Streda – 2014
Damjan Đoković – FC Spartak Trnava – 2010

Czech Republic
Jakub Diviš – 1. FC Tatran Prešov – 2009–2013
Lukáš Zich – MFK Ružomberok – 2012–2013
Tomáš Josl – 1. FC Tatran Prešov – 2007–11
Jakub Plánička – 1. FC Tatran Prešov – 2010–2013
Jiří Kladrubský – ŠK Slovan Bratislava – 2011–2014
Martin Raška – FC Spartak Trnava – 2010–2013
Patrik Gross – FC Spartak Trnava – 2010–2013
Martin Vyskočil – ŠK Slovan Bratislava, MŠK Žilina, 1. FC Tatran Prešov, FC Spartak Trnava – 2006, 2009–11, 2011, 2011–present
Jiří Koubský – FC Spartak Trnava – 2011–2012
Karel Kroupa – MFK Ružomberok, FK Senica, FC Nitra – 2010, 2011, 2012
Miroslav Štěpánek – FK Senica – 2012
Petr Pavlík – FK Senica – 2011–present
Erich Brabec – FK Senica – 2012–2013
Petr Hošek – FK Senica, FK DAC 1904 Dunajská Streda  – 2011–2013, 2013
Jaroslav Diviš – FK Senica – 2010–2013
Adam Varadi – FK Senica – 2012
Jan Kalabiška – FK Senica – 2011–present
Václav Koutný – FK Senica – 2012
Jaroslav Černý – FK Senica – 2012–2013
Martin Frýdek – FK Senica – 2012
Milan Švenger – FK Senica – 2012–2013
Tomáš Huber – MFK Ružomberok, FK DAC 1904 Dunajská Streda – 2011, 2012–13
Josef Kaufman – FC Spartak Trnava – 2012
Ondřej Smetana – FK Senica, ŠK Slovan Bratislava – 2010–11, 2012
Tomáš Strnad – FK Dukla Banská Bystrica, FK Senica – 2007–08, 2010–12
Petr Bolek – FC ViOn Zlaté Moravce, FK Senica – 2008–09, 2010–12
Jiří Skalák – MFK Ružomberok – 2011–12
Martin Hruška – FC Spartak Trnava, FC ViOn Zlaté Moravce – 2007–10, 2011–12
Petr Kaspřák – FC Nitra – 2009–12, 2013
Ondřej Murín – FC Nitra – 2012
David Střihavka – MŠK Žilina, 1. FC Tatran Prešov, FK Dukla Banská Bystrica – 2011, 2012, 2014–
Jan Krob – 1. FC Tatran Prešov – 2011–12, 2013–2014
Libor Žůrek – 1. FC Tatran Prešov – 2011
Pavel Malcharek – FC Spartak Trnava – 2011
Jan Kadlec – FK DAC 1904 Dunajská Streda – 2011
David Helísek – FK DAC 1904 Dunajská Streda – 2009–11
Jiří Valenta – FK Senica – 2011
Petr Šíma – FK Senica – 2011
David Šmahaj – MFK Ružomberok – 2011
Tomáš Krbeček – MFK Ružomberok – 2011
Ivo Táborský – ŠK Slovan Bratislava – 2011
Lukáš Hartig – Artmedia Petržalka, ŠK Slovan Bratislava – 2005–06, 2011
Radek Dosoudil – ŠK Slovan Bratislava – 2009–12
Jan Králík – ŠK Slovan Bratislava – 2008–11
Tomáš Hrdlička – ŠK Slovan Bratislava – 2011
Aleš Urbánek – Artmedia Petržalka, FK Senica, FK DAC 1904 Dunajská Streda – 2005–06,2007–10, 2011, 2012
Martin Komárek – FK Senica – 2010–11
Ondřej Šourek – MŠK Žilina – 2008–11
Emil Rilke – MŠK Žilina – 2008–11
Jakub Dohnálek – FC Spartak Trnava – 2010–11
Libor Hrdlička – MFK Ružomberok – 2010–12
Vojtěch Schulmeister – FC Nitra – 2011
Lukáš Matůš – FK DAC 1904 Dunajská Streda – 2011–12
David Čep – 1. FC Tatran Prešov – 2008–11
Jakub Heidenreich – 1. FC Tatran Prešov – 2011–12
Tomáš Polách – MFK Dubnica – 1997-00,2011
Jan Trousil – MFK Dubnica – 2011
Dennis Christu – MŠK Žilina – 2010–11
David Kobylík – MŠK Žilina – 2009–10
Jakub Rada – ŠK Slovan Bratislava – 2008
David Bičík – ŠK Slovan Bratislava – 2008–10
Dominik Rodinger – ŠK Slovan Bratislava, FK Dukla Banská Bystrica – 2008–11, 2013
Pavel Besta – MFK Ružomberok – 2010
Petr Faldyna – FK Senica – 2009–11
Tomáš Čáp – FK Senica – 2009–10
Jiří Homola – FK Senica – 2009
Jakub Podaný – FK Senica – 2010
Jan Halama – FK Senica – 2010
Tomáš Vrťo – FK Senica – 2010–11, 2013
Michal Ščasný – 1. FC Tatran Prešov – 2008–10
Martin Nahodil – FK DAC 1904 Dunajská Streda – 2010
Benjamin Vomáčka – ŠK Slovan Bratislava, MŠK Žilina – 2002–03, 2004–09
Pavel Devátý – MŠK Žilina, FC Spartak Trnava – 2006–08, 2008–09
Lukáš Došek – FC Spartak Trnava – 2008–09
Václav Drobný – FC Spartak Trnava – 2008–09
Jiří Mašek – MFK Ružomberok – 2008–09
Tomáš Pešír – MFK Ružomberok – 2009
Petr Kobylík – 1. FC Tatran Prešov – 2008–10
Petr Zapalač – MFK Dubnica – 2009–10
Lukáš Bodeček – FK DAC 1904 Dunajská Streda – 2009
Milan Páleník – FK Dukla Banská Bystrica, FK DAC 1904 Dunajská Streda – 2004–07, 2009
David Kotrys – MFK Ružomberok, FK Dukla Banská Bystrica – 2005–06, 2006–09
Filip Racko – FC Nitra – 2008–09
Tomáš Čáp – FK Senica – 2009–10
Pavel Bartoš – FK Senica – 2009
Radek Sláma – FK Senica – 2009–10
Zbyněk Pospěch – Artmedia Petržalka – 2008
Roman Švrček – FC Nitra – 2008–09
Jan Gruber – FC Nitra – 2007–09
Pavel Simr – FC Nitra – 2008–09
Jakub Hottek – FC Nitra – 2008
Jan Broschinský – FC Nitra – 2008–09
Martin Bača – FC Nitra – 2008
Tomáš Janíček – FC Nitra – 2007–08
Pavel Vrána – FC Nitra, FK Dukla Banská Bystrica – 2007–08, 2013
Jan Vojáček – FC Spartak Trnava – 2008
Lukáš Vaculík – FC Spartak Trnava – 2008
Lukáš Nachtman – ŠK Slovan Bratislava, MFK Petržalka – 2008–11, 2009
Martin Švestka – MFK Dubnica, MŠK Žilina, ŠK Slovan Bratislava – 2002–04, 2005–07, 2007–08
Filip Herda – FK Dukla Banská Bystrica – 2007–09
Jindřich Skácel – FC ViOn Zlaté Moravce – 2008
Martin Bednář – FC ViOn Zlaté Moravce – 2007–08
Jiří Krohmer – 1. FC Tatran Prešov – 2008–09
Aleš Pikl – 1. FC Tatran Prešov – 2008–09
Tomáš Kaplan – 1. FC Tatran Prešov – 2008–09
Martin Kasálek – FK AS Trenčín – 2006–07
Daniel Tchuř – Artmedia Petržalka – 2004–07
Aleš Hellebrand – MFK Ružomberok, Artmedia Petržalka – 1999-01, 2001–05
Radim Wozniak – FK Dukla Banská Bystrica – 2005–06
Radek Bukač – FK Dukla Banská Bystrica – 2005
Tomáš Bernady – 1. FC Tatran Prešov, ŠK Slovan Bratislava, Matador Púchov, FK Inter Bratislava – 1990, 1997–01, 2001–05, 2005–07
Michal Prokeš – Matador Púchov – 2004–06
Aleš Besta – MŠK Žilina, Matador Púchov – 2003–04, 2004–05
Jiří Pospíšil – MFK Ružomberok – 2003–07
Miloš Buchta – FK AS Trenčín, 1. FC Tatran Prešov – 2004–08, 2008–09
Josef Dvorník – MFK Ružomberok – 2006–07
Jiří Rychlík – MFK Ružomberok – 2006
Jan Nezmar – MFK Ružomberok – 2005–07
Pavel Zbožínek – MFK Ružomberok – 2005–06
Jan Buryán – Artmedia Petržalka – 2006–08
Lubomír Blaha – FC Spartak Trnava – 2006
Jan Nečas – FK AS Trenčín, FC Nitra – 2001–04, 2005–06
Vít Turtenwald – FC Spartak Trnava – 2005–07
Tomáš Kaňa – FK AS Trenčín – 2007–08
Martin Doubek – FK AS Trenčín – 2007
Roman Dobeš – FK AS Trenčín – 2006–07
Jiří Barcal – FK AS Trenčín – 2007
Petr Musil – FK Inter Bratislava – 2006–07
Marek Čech – MŠK Žilina, FC Spartak Trnava – 2001–03, 2003–04
Radek Opršal – FC Nitra, 1. FC Košice, FK Inter Bratislava – 2000, 2000–01, 2001–04
František Ševinský – Artmedia Petržalka – 2002–03
Jiří Kobr – 1. FC Košice – 2001–04
Vít Baránek – 1. FC Košice – 2003
Martin Černoch – 1. HFC Humenné, FC Spartak Trnava – 1999-00, 2000–01
Lubor Knapp – Ozeta Dukla Trenčín, FC Spartak Trnava, FC Senec – 2001, 2001–02, 2008
Radim Nečas – ŠK Slovan Bratislava – 2001–03
Pavel Hašek – Artmedia Petržalka – 2008
Jakub Řezníček – MFK Ružomberok – 2009–10
Petr Švancara – FK Inter Bratislava – 2007–09
Petr Lysáček – ZŤS Dubnica – 2001–03
Petr Vybíral – Tatran Prešov – 2001–02
Leoš Mitas – Tatran Prešov – 2001
David Homoláč – ŠK Slovan Bratislava – 2002–03
Pavel Putík – MŠK Žilina – 2003
Tomáš Mazouch – MFK Dubnica – 2004–05
Radim Krupník – FK AS Trenčín – 2003–04
Karel Vácha – Artmedia Petržalka – 2003
Radek Krejčík – Artmedia Petržalka – 2003–05
Zdeněk Valnoha – MFK Ružomberok – 2003
Milan Kopic – ŠK Slovan Bratislava – 2012
Vlastimil Stožický – FC Spartak Trnava – 2012
Lukáš Kutra – FC Nitra – 2013–2014
Erik Daniel – Spartak Myjava – 2013–present
Milan Jirásek – FK Senica – 2013–2014
Pavel Fořt – ŠK Slovan Bratislava – 2013–present
Pavel Čermák – FK Senica – 2013
Martin Zeman – FK Senica – 2013
Martin Hála – FC Nitra – 2013
Adam Ševčík – FC Nitra – 2013
Tomáš Poznar – FC Spartak Trnava – 2013
Jan Kliment – FK Dukla Banská Bystrica – 2014
Jiří Böhm – FC Nitra – 2014
Dušan Nulíček – FK DAC 1904 Dunajská Streda – 2013
Tomáš Jablonský – ŠK Slovan Bratislava – 2014–present
Luboš Hušek – FK Senica – 2014–present
Petr Wojnar – FK Dukla Banská Bystrica – 2014–present
Nicolas Šumský – FK Dukla Banská Bystrica – 2014–present

Djibouti
Ahmed Kadar – FK DAC 1904 Dunajská Streda – 2008–11

England
James Lawrence – FK AS Trenčín – 2014–present

Finland
Tani Stafsula – FK DAC 1904 Dunajská Streda – 2009

France
Floris Isola – MFK Košice – 2011–12
Karim Coulibaly – MFK Košice – 2011–present
Victor Abdou Samb – FK Senica – 2009–10
Youssouf Kanté – MFK Košice – 2009–10
Youssef Moughfire – FC Senec, FK DAC 1904 Dunajská Streda – 2005–07, 2008–09
Jim Ablancourt – MFK Ružomberok – 2005–06
Toto Sena Govou – MFK Košice – 2011
Oumar Diaby – MFK Košice – 2012–present

Gabon
Arsène Copa – FK DAC 1904 Dunajská Streda – 2012

Gambia
Momodou Ceesay – MŠK Žilina – 2010–2012
Ali Ceesay – MŠK Žilina – 2011–2013

Georgia
Giorgi Tsimakuridze – MŠK Žilina – 2009
Irakli Liluashvili – FC Nitra – 2007–10

Germany
Yusuf Adewunmi – MFK Petržalka – 2007
Juvhel Tsoumou – FK Senica – 2013

Ghana
Prince Ofori – MŠK Žilina – 2006–12
Prince Addai – FK AS Trenčín – 2008
William Anane – FC Senec – 2005–06
John Mensah – FC Nitra – 2014

Greece
Angelos Chanti – FK AS Trenčín – 2008–09

Guinea
Boubacar Diallo – FC Spartak Trnava – 2010–11
Seydouba Soumah – – FC Nitra, ŠK Slovan Bratislava – 2012, 2013–present
Aboubacar Fofana – FK Dukla Banská Bystrica – 2007

Guinea-Bissau
Vladimir Forbs – FC Nitra – 2014

Honduras
Luis Ramos – MŠK Žilina, FC Nitra – 2005–06, 2006–07

Hungary
Csaba Regedei – FK DAC 1904 Dunajská Streda – 2008–09

Indonesia
Egy Maulana Vikri – FK Senica, FC ViOn Zlaté Moravce – 2021–22, 2022–present
Witan Sulaeman – FK Senica, AS Trenčín – 2021–22, 2022–present

Iran
Javad Razzaghi – FK DAC 1904 Dunajská Streda – 2002–03
Farzad Ashoubi – FK DAC 1904 Dunajská Streda – 2003–04
Reza Ghanizadeh – FK DAC 1904 Dunajská Streda – 2005–06, 2013–14
Mohammad Parvin – FK DAC 1904 Dunajská Streda – 2008–09
Behshad Yavarzadeh – FK DAC 1904 Dunajská Streda – 2009–10

Italy
Giovanni Speranza – FK DAC 1904 Dunajská Streda – 2009
Marco De Vito – FK Dukla Banská Bystrica – 2013–present

Ivory Coast
Koro Koné – FC Spartak Trnava – 2009–11
Mamadou Bagayoko – Artmedia Petržalka, ŠK Slovan Bratislava – 2009, 2008–present
 Lamine Diarrassouba  –  FK Senica  – 2012–2013
Soune Soungole – FC Spartak Trnava – 2014–present

Kenya
Patrick Oboya – MFK Ružomberok – 2012

Korea Republic
Kim Tae-Hyung – FK Senica – 2010

Kuwait
Khalid Al-Rashidi – 1. FC Tatran Prešov – 2008–10

Latvia
Artūrs Zjuzins – MŠK Žilina – 2011

Lithuania
Tomas Radzinevičius – FK Senica – 2010
Marius Kazlauskas – FK DAC 1904 Dunajská Streda – 2009–2010
Ričardas Beniušis – FK DAC 1904 Dunajská Streda – 2009
Egidijus Majus – FK DAC 1904 Dunajská Streda – 2009–10, 2011

Macedonia
Aleksandar Bajevski – FK DAC 1904 Dunajská Streda – 2009-10
Ilami Halimi – FK DAC 1904 Dunajská Streda – 2009-11
Dejan Iliev – ŠKF Sereď – 2019-present
Kire Markoski – FC Spartak Trnava – 2018
Dejan Peševski – MFK Ružomberok, FC Spartak Trnava – 2013, 2013
Shaqir Rexhepi – MFK Košice – 2012
Ardit Shaqiri – MFK Ružomberok – 2010-11
Darko Tofiloski – MFK Košice, MFK Ružomberok, FC DAC 1904 Dunajská Streda – 2010-15, 2015-16, 2016-17

Malta
Jean Paul Farrugia – FC Spartak Trnava – 2014–present

Mexico
Manuel Rivera – FC Spartak Trnava – 2006

Montenegro
Ivica Kralj – FC Spartak Trnava – 2008–09
Nenad Đurović – FC Spartak Trnava – 2008
Marko Kerić – FC Spartak Trnava – 2004–05
Dejan Boljević – 1. FC Tatran Prešov – 2012

Netherlands
Wim Bokila – MŠK Žilina – 2011
Samuel Koejoe – FK DAC 1904 Dunajská Streda – 2009–10
Stef Wijlaars  –  FK Senica  – 2010–2013
Danny van der Ree – FK AS Trenčín – 2008
Thijs Sluijter – FK AS Trenčín – 2008
Gino van Kessel – FK AS Trenčín – 2013–2014

Niger
Siradji Sani – MFK Dubnica, FK Inter Bratislava – 2001–02, 2002

Nigeria
Onome Sodje – FK Senica – 2010
Hector Tubonemi – MFK Dubnica – 2010
Duke Udi – ŠK Slovan Bratislava – 1996–97
Fanendo Adi – FK AS Trenčín – 2009–11, 2012–13
Peter Nworah – FC Spartak Trnava, FO ŽP Šport Podbrezová – 2013–14, 2014–present
Franklin Ekene Igwe – FC Nitra – 2014
Christian Irobiso – FK Senica – 2014
Kingsley Madu – FK AS Trenčín – 2014–present
Moses Simon – FK AS Trenčín – 2014–present
Rabiu Ibrahim – FK AS Trenčín – 2014–present
Emmanuel Edmond – FK AS Trenčín – 2014–present

Panama
Rolando Blackburn – FK Senica – 2012–13

Paraguay
Jorge Salinas – FK AS Trenčín – 2011–12

Peru
Jean Deza – MŠK Žilina – 2011–present

Philippines
Stephan Palla – FK DAC 1904 Dunajská Streda – 2010

Poland
Grzegorz Szamotulski – FK DAC 1904 Dunajská Streda – 2010–11

Portugal
Ricardo Nunes  –  MŠK Žilina  – 2012–2013
Guima – MŠK Žilina – 2012
Bruno Simão – ŠK Slovan Bratislava – 2009

Romania
Marius Alexe – Podbrezová – 2017
Omer Damianovici – ŠK Slovan Bratislava – 2001
Bogdan Mitrea – Spartak Trnava – 2019–

Russia
Nika Piliyev – ŠK Slovan Bratislava – 2012
Dmitri Kraush – Baník Prievidza, Matador Púchov – 1993–98, 1998–03
Stanislav Tskhovrebov – ŠK Slovan Bratislava, FC Nitra – 1993, 1993–94
Aleksei Snigiryov – 1. FC Košice – 1999

Senegal
Souleymane Fall – FC Spartak Trnava – 1999-06
Papé Diakite – FK AS Trenčín – 2011–12
Mouhamadou Seye – MFK Dubnica, FK Dukla Banská Bystrica – 2007–09, 2009–11
Samba El Hadji Kebe – FC Spartak Trnava – 2009
Amdy Gueye – FC Spartak Trnava – 2008–09
Babacar Niang – FC Spartak Trnava – 2008–09

Serbia
Nemanja Matić – MFK Košice – 2007–09
Nemanja Vidaković – FK DAC 1904 Dunajská Streda – 2010
Dušan Matović – FK Inter Bratislava – 2006–07
Saša Savić – FK Dukla Banská Bystrica – 2009–present
Boris Sekulić – MFK Košice – 2012–present
Ivan Ostojić – MFK Košice – 2012–present
Uroš Matić – MFK Košice  – 2009–2013
Marko Milinković – MFK Košice, ŠK Slovan Bratislava – 2007–11, 2011–present
Miroslav Marković – MFK Ružomberok – 2012
Ivan Đoković – MFK Košice – 2010–12
Samir Nurković – MFK Košice, FC ViOn Zlaté Moravce, FC DAC 1904 Dunajská Streda – 2011–12, 2013, 2014
Miloje Preković – MFK Košice – 2011–12
Milomir Sivčević – MFK Ružomberok – 2007–12
Nemanja Zlatković – MŠK Žilina – 2009–11
Marko Radić – MFK Ružomberok – 2010–11
Marko Jakšić – MFK Ružomberok – 2010–11
Marko Blažić – MFK Ružomberok – 2011
Srdjan Grabež – MFK Dubnica, FC Spartak Trnava – 2010–11, 2013–present
Aleksandar Paunović – MFK Košice – 2010
Miloš Stojanović – FC ViOn Zlaté Moravce – 2010
Borivoje Filipović – FC Spartak Trnava – 2007–09
Nebojša Jelenković – FC Spartak Trnava – 2008–09
Milorad Bukvić – ŠK Slovan Bratislava, Artmedia Petržalka – 2003–04, 2004–05,2009
Stefan Gavarić – MŠK Žilina – 2005–06
Predrag Mijić – MFK Ružomberok – 2004–05
Vojin Prole – ŠK Slovan Bratislava – 2001–07
Branislav Vukomanović – Artmedia Petržalka – 2006–07
Dragan Mojić – ŠK Slovan Bratislava – 2001–02
Kosta Bjedov – MFK Košice – 2007
Ivan Trifunović – Matador Púchov – 2001–02
Saša Mićović – FK Inter Bratislava – 2001–02
Bojan Čukić – MFK Košice – 2010
Vladan Spasojević – MFK Košice – 2010
Zlatko Zebić – 1. FC Košice – 2000–01
Nebojša Klještan – ŠK Slovan Bratislava – 2001–02
Milisav Šećković – FK Inter Bratislava – 2001–02
Miloš Obradović  –  FC Nitra  – 2013 
Dušan Plavšić – FK Dukla Banská Bystrica – 2014–present
Bojan Knežević – FC Spartak Trnava – 2014–present
Milan Rundić – FK AS Trenčín – 2013–present
Lazar Đorđević – MFK Košice – 2013–present
Milorad Nikolić  –  MFK Ružomberok  – 2013-2014
Goran Adamović  –  MFK Ružomberok  – 2013-2014
Stefan Durić – FC Spartak Trnava – 2014–present
Miloš Nikolić – FC ViOn Zlaté Moravce – 2014–present
Dušan Đuričić – FC ViOn Zlaté Moravce – 2014–present
Branislav Stanić – FC ViOn Zlaté Moravce – 2014–present
Nikola Andrić – ŽP Šport Podbrezová – 2011–present
Miloš Josimov – ŠK Slovan Bratislava – 2013–present

Slovenia
Dare Vršič – MŠK Žilina – 2005–07
Andrej Pečnik – ŠK Slovan Bratislava – 2010–11
Ajdin Redzić – MFK Košice – 2014–present
Matic Maruško – FC Spartak Trnava – 2013

South Africa
Bridget Motha – FK Senica – 2011
Sibusiso Ntuli – FC Nitra – 2011

Spain
Juanpe – 1. FC Tatran Prešov – 2009–10
Juan Carlos Pozo – 1. FC Tatran Prešov – 2008–09
Fernando – MFK Košice – 2009–10, 2011–12
Stefan Milojević – MFK Košice – 2012
Gerrit Stoeten – MFK Košice – 2010
Antonio Megías – MFK Košice – 2010
Carlos Pérez – FC Spartak Trnava – 2008–09
Eric Barroso – FC Nitra – 2013
José Casado – FC Spartak Trnava – 2014–present

Syria
Ammar Ramadan – FC Spartak Trnava, FC DAC 1904 Dunajská Streda – 2021–22, 2022–present

Togo
Serge Akakpo – MŠK Žilina – 2012–2013

Trinidad and Tobago
Lester Peltier – FK AS Trenčín, ŠK Slovan Bratislava – 2011–12, 2012–present

Tunisia
Nizar Ben Nasra – FC DAC 1904 Dunajská Streda – 2013–2014

Ukraine
Anton Lysyuk – 1. FC Tatran Prešov – 2012
Mykhaylo Olefirenko – 1. FC Tatran Prešov – 1991–92
Andriy Yakovlev – 1. FC Tatran Prešov – 2012–2013
Oleksandr Pyschur – MFK Ružomberok – 2009–10
Ruslan Lyubarskyi – Chemlon Humenné, 1. FC Košice – 1993–96, 1997–00
Serhiy Zaytsev – 1. FC Tatran Prešov, FK AS Trenčín, 1. FC Košice – 1997-00,2001–02, 2000–01, 2002–03
Viktor Dvirnyk – FK Inter Bratislava – 1995
Oleksandr Holokolosov – ZŤS Dubnica – 1997–98, 2002–03
Andriy Shevchuk – 1. FC Tatran Prešov – 2012
Andriy Slinkin – FK Senica – 2014

Uruguay
Sebastián Sosa – FK Senica – 2014

Uzbekistan
Aziz Ibrahimov – ŠK Slovan Bratislava – 2007–08

Venezuela
Fernando de Ornelas – ŠK Slovan Bratislava – 2000

Zimbabwe
Kennedy Chihuri – 1. FC Tatran Prešov – 1994–96
Alois Bunjira – ŠK Slovan Bratislava – 1995

References

External links

Corgoň Liga website

 
Slovak First League
Slovak First League players
foreign
Association football player non-biographical articles